Ausonia Montes  is a mountain (officially mountains) in the Mare Tyrrhenum quadrangle of Mars, at 25.42° south latitude and 99.04° east longitude.

References

Mare Tyrrhenum quadrangle
Mountains on Mars